Beckingham railway station was a station in Beckingham, Nottinghamshire on the line between Gainsborough and Doncaster. The station opened on 16 July 1867, and passenger services were withdrawn on 2 November 1959, although the line through the station remains open. Goods trains served the station until 19 August 1963.

References

Bibliography

Disused railway stations in Nottinghamshire
Former Great Northern and Great Eastern Joint Railway stations
Railway stations in Great Britain opened in 1867
Railway stations in Great Britain closed in 1959